The 6R is a six-speed automatic transmission for longitudinal engine placement in rear-wheel drive vehicles. It is based on the ZF 6HP26 transmission and is built under license by the Ford Motor Company at its Livonia Transmission plant in Livonia, Michigan. The 6R debuted in 2005 in the 2006 model year Ford Explorer and Mercury Mountaineer.

The 6R80 was available in 2009 and until 2017 Ford F-150 trucks. It features torque converter lockup capabilities in all 6 gears and an integrated "Tow/Haul" mode for enhanced engine braking and towing performance. For the 2011 model year, the transmission was revised to provide smoother shifts, improved fuel economy, and overall better shift performance. Most notable of the improvements was the addition of a one-way clutch that provided smoother 1-2 up-shifts and 2-1 down-shifts. The transmission has a relatively low 1st gear and two overdrive gears, the highest of which is 0.69:1. This provides exceptional towing performance when needed, while maximizing fuel economy by offering low engine speeds while cruising.

The 6R80 can be found behind the 3.7L V6 all the way up to the 6.2L V8. Ford has stated that while the transmission is used in multiple applications, each transmission is optimized and integrated differently depending on the engine it is mated to. The 6R80 features "Filled for Life" low viscosity synthetic transmission fluid (MERCON LV), though a fluid flush is recommended at 150,000 miles if your truck falls under the classification of "Severe Duty" operation. The transmission, as used in the Ford F-150, has a fluid capacity of 13.1 quarts and weighs 215 lbs.

Specifications

Preliminary Note

The 6R-transmissions are based on the ZF 6HP gearbox. The gear sets of the 6R140 are deviant.

Technical data

Applications

6R60 or 6R80 

 
 2009-2017 - 6R80
 Ford Ranger (T6)
 2011-present - 6R80 (on 3.2L and 2.2 single turbo diesel engines)
 Ford Everest
 2015-present - 6R80 (on 3.2L and 2.2 single turbo diesel engines)
 Mazda BT-50
 2011-present - 6R80 (on 3.2L and 2.2 single turbo diesel engines)

6R60 

 2006-2008 Ford Explorer/Mercury Mountaineer w/ 4.6L V8

6R80 

 2009–2017 Ford F-150
 2018-present Ford F-150 3.3L
 2009–2018 Ford Expedition/Lincoln Navigator  
2009-2010  Mercury Mountaineer
 2011–2016 Ford Territory (SZ TCDi)
 2011-2017 Ford Mustang V6, GT, Ecoboost(15-17)
 2011-present Ford Ranger 2.2L, 3.2L
 2011-present Mazda BT-50 2.2L, 3.2L
 2015-present Ford Everest 2.2L, 3.2L
 2015-2019 Ford Transit

References

See also 
 List of Ford transmissions

6R